The 1952 Soviet football championship was the 20th seasons of competitive football in the Soviet Union and the 14th among teams of sports societies and factories. Spartak Moscow won the championship becoming the Soviet domestic champions for the fourth time and the first after World War II, the Spartak's main rivals Dinamo again had a difficult season struggling only for the second.

The defending champions CDSA were expelled from the league for the poor performance of the USSR national football team at the 1952 Summer Olympics in Helsinki. The Class A started late mid-summer consisting only of a single round-robin with almost all games played in Moscow.

Honours

Notes = Number in parentheses is the times that club has won that honour. * indicates new record for competition

Soviet Union football championship

Class A

Class B (second stage)

For places 1-9

For places 10-18
Played in Rostov-na-Donu

Relegation play-off
To the play-off qualified the champion of the 1952 Football Championship of the Ukrainian SSR and the worst Ukrainian team of masters of the 1952 Soviet Class B.

|}

Top goalscorers

Class A
Andrei Zazroyev (Dinamo Kiev) – 11 goals

References

External links
 1952 Soviet football championship. RSSSF